151st meridian can refer to:

151st  meridian east, a line of longitude east of the Greenwich Meridian
151st meridian west, a line of longitude west of the Greenwich Meridian